James Michael Apsley Turner,  (born 22 May 1996) is an Australian Paralympic athlete and soccer player with cerebral palsy. He has represented Australia as part of the Australia Paralympic soccer team, the ParaRoos, and was its player of the year in 2013. At the 2016 Summer Paralympics, he won the Men's 800m T36 in a world record time of 2:02.39. At the 2017 World Para Athletics Championships in London, he won three gold medals; he followed this up with two gold medals at the 2019 World Para Athletics Championships in Dubai and a gold and silver medal at the 2020 Paralympic Games in Tokyo.

Personal
James Turner was born on 22 May 1996 in Sydney, New South Wales. He has cerebral palsy. He grew up in Diamond Beach, New South Wales. In 2015, he commenced a Bachelor of Mechanical Engineering at the University of Wollongong. He has since moved to Canberra and commenced a Bachelor of Sports and Exercise Science at the University of Canberra.

Football
Turner played 7-a-side soccer as a midfielder for New South Wales starting in 2009, and for the Australian national 7-a-side team, the Pararoos, in 2012. By November 2013, he had 16 caps, and was named Paralympic Football Player of the Year at the 2013 FFA Australian Football Awards night on 13 November 2013. The head coach of the Pararoos, Paul Brown, said that "James has pace to burn and he gets forward on the overlap to worry defenders in their third. He has the potential to be one of the best players that Australia has ever produced if he stays on the path that he is at present". Unfortunately for the Pararoos, ranked tenth in the world, in July 2014 the Australian Sports Commission cut funding for the 7-a-side soccer program on the grounds that the team was unlikely to make the 2016 Summer Paralympics. After a public outcry, the team was revived with a new funding model in 2015. Despite the fundraising efforts, the Pararoos failed to qualify for Rio.

Athletics
Turner started with Forster-Tuncurry Athletics club as an eight-year-old and at the age of 15 joined the Hunter Academy of Sport AWD middle-distance running program. In 2015, Turner turned his talents to back athletics on the encouragement of Athletics Australia, where he is classified as a T36 athlete. He was coached first by Marie Kay and from 2016 by Brett Robinson in Wollongong, New South Wales. At the Australian Athletics Championships in March 2016, he ran the 800m in 2:08.90, which was a Paralympic qualifier. In the IPC Grand Prix in Canberra February, he had posted an even faster time of 2.08.8. In August 2016, it was announced that had been selected to represent Australia at the 2016 Summer Paralympics in Rio de Janeiro in the 800m event. He was ranked number two in the world in this event in his classification.

At the 2016 Summer Paralympics, Turner won the Men's 800m T36 in a world record time of 2:02.39. In December 2016, he was named Australian Paralympic Rookie of the Year.

At the 2017 World Para Athletics Championships in London, Turner won three gold medals – Men's 200m T36 (world record time 24.09 (−0.4)), Men's 400m T36 and Men's 800m T36. After the London 2017 World Para-Athletics Championships, James moved to Canberra to be coached by Iryna Dvoskina at the Australian Institute Of Sport.

Turner's Rio Paralympics gold medal event, the 800m, is not on the 2020 Tokyo Paralympics program. As a result, he has changed to short distances – currently the 100m and 400m.

At the 2019 World Para Athletics Championships in Dubai, Turner ran 11.72 and broke the world record in winning the Men's 100m T36 and followed up with gold in the Men's 400m T46 in a world record time of 51.71.

Turner competed at the 2020 Summer Paralympics in Tokyo. He won gold in the Men's 400 metres T36, setting a new games record with a time of 52.80. He also won silver in the Men's 400 m T36 having qualified first in his heat.

Recognition
 2016 – Athletics Australia 2016 Male Para-athlete of the Year.
 2017 – Medal of the Order of Australia in 2017.
 2018 – Athletics Australia 2017 Male Para-athlete of the Year.
2020 – Athletics Australia 2019 Male Para-athlete of the Year.
2021 - CBR Sports Awards - Athlete of the Year - Para Sport

References

External links
 
 
 Athletics Australia Results
 

Paralympic athletes of Australia
Athletes (track and field) at the 2016 Summer Paralympics
Athletes (track and field) at the 2020 Summer Paralympics
Paralympic gold medalists for Australia
Paralympic silver medalists for Australia
Medalists at the 2016 Summer Paralympics
Medalists at the 2020 Summer Paralympics
Living people
1996 births
Recipients of the Medal of the Order of Australia
World record holders in Paralympic athletics
World Para Athletics Championships winners
Paralympic medalists in athletics (track and field)
Australian male sprinters
Australian male middle-distance runners